Donavon Stinson (born August 25, 1976 in Rivers, Manitoba) is an actor in motion capture, film and television.

Career
Moving to Vancouver in 1997, Donavon auditioned for a motion capture role in Mainframe Entertainment’s, Heavy Gear. He got the role which lead many other motion capture roles in such titles as Spiderman, Max Steel, Barbie, and District 9. From motion capture roles, Donavon transitioned to live action roles in film and television, starting on the Fox Series Dark Angel; followed by feature film appearances including A Guy Thing, Fantastic Four, X-Files: I Want to Believe and Warcraft. His most notable television credits are Three Moons Over Milford, Reaper, Call Me Fitz and, most recently, UnREAL. He landed a Canadian Leo Award for his role as Josh McTaggert in Call Me Fitz, and the cast were nominated for Best Ensemble Performance in a Comedy Program or Series in the 26th Gemini Awards.

Filmography

Film

Television

References

External links 
 
 Leo Awards-2014 

1976 births
Living people
21st-century Canadian male actors
21st-century Canadian comedians
Canadian male television actors
Canadian sketch comedians
Canadian male comedians